The Lent Bumps 2008 were a series of rowing races at the University of Cambridge held on the River Cam from Tuesday 26 February 2008 until Saturday 1 March 2008. The event was run as a bumps race and was the 121st race in the series of Lent Bumps, which have been held annually in late February or early March on the 7th week of Lent Term in this form since 1887. See Lent Bumps for the format of the races. A total of 121 crews took part (69 men's crews and 52 women's crews), comprising nearly 1100 participants in total.

Head of the River crews

It is the first time they have held it for two consecutive years.

  women also rowed over every day to retain the headship, their second ever.

 continued to hold a double headship, the only club other than  ever to achieve this, and are the first club to defend a double headship successfully.

Highest 2nd VIIIs

  bumped  on the Friday to become the highest men's 2nd VIII.

 Jesus II women made history for the second set of bumps in a row, bumping up into the first division to remain the highest placed women's 2nd crew for the 8th year and into a position that has never been achieved before.

Links to races in other years

Bumps Charts

Below are the bumps charts all 4 men's and all 3 women's divisions, with the men's event on the left and women's event on the right. The bumps chart represents the progress of every crew over all four days of the racing. To follow the progress of any particular crew, simply find the crew's name on the left side of the chart and follow the line to the end-of-the-week finishing position on the right of the chart.

Note that this chart may not be displayed correctly if you are using a large font size on your browser. A simple way to check is to see that the first horizontal bold line, marking the boundary between divisions, lies between positions 17 and 18. The combined Hughes Hall/Lucy Cavendish women's crews are listed as Lucy Cavendish only.

References
CUCBC – the organisation that runs the bumps
First and Third Trinity Boat Club
Cambridge University Radio (CUR1350) downloadable MP3s of race commentary

Lent Bumps results
2008 in rowing
2008 in English sport